From a Page is a mini-album by the English progressive rock band Yes, released on 25 October 2019 by Yes Records. It contains four previously unreleased tracks originally recorded by the 2008–2011 line-up of the group and intended for release on an album, but ultimately weren't included on Fly from Here. During this time, the lineup included bassist Chris Squire, guitarist Steve Howe, drummer Alan White, singer Benoît David, and keyboardist Oliver Wakeman. Wakeman, who wrote most of the material on From a Page, was inspired to release it following Squire's death in 2015.

Overview
The release is based around four songs developed by the band in 2009/10, but not then used on 2011's Fly from Here. The line-up is bassist Chris Squire, guitarist Steve Howe, drummer Alan White, singer Benoît David and keyboardist Oliver Wakeman. Wakeman assembled the material following Squire's death.

Release
From a Page was released exclusively through Burning Shed as a single (five-track) vinyl mini-LP (YES002LP) and as the (four-track) first disc of a 3-CD mini box set (YES002BX) along with a re-release of the band's 2011 double live album In the Present – Live from Lyon, recorded in 2009 by the same line-up that recorded From a Page. A digital release came 16 April 2021. According to Wakeman, From a Page may be distributed to stores in other countries "at some point in the future".

Cover art
The cover art was made by long-time Yes collaborator Roger Dean.

Songs
The vinyl and first CD contain 4 songs, 3 being previously unreleased studio songs that were worked on in the Fly from Here sessions in late 2010 and the fourth being a new recording of an unfinished song from the same period named "From the Turn of a Card". The song was developed at the same time as the other songs, but not completed. "From the Turn of a Card" was subsequently recorded and released in 2013 on the album Ravens & Lullabies by Gordon Giltrap and Oliver Wakeman, with Benoît David on lead vocals. The "From the Turn of a Card"  version here is a piano/vocal duet taking David's vocal from that album and using a newly recorded piano accompaniment by Wakeman.

Parts of "The Gift of Love" were based on a piece of music developed for a planned Chris Squire solo album in sessions with Gerard Johnson after he and Squire left The Syn. More of that piece of music was adapted for use on "The Game", the second track on the band's 2014 album Heaven & Earth.

A lyric video for the single mix of "To the Moment" was released on YouTube. The 4:22 single mix version of the track "To the Moment" was only available on the vinyl edition until the 2021 digital version was released.

Track listing

Vinyl edition

CD edition

Personnel 
Credits adapted from the vinyl edition.

Yes
 Benoît David – lead vocals, acoustic guitar 
 Steve Howe – acoustic and electric guitars, backing vocals
 Chris Squire – bass, backing vocals
 Oliver Wakeman – keyboards, vocals, production, design, layout
 Alan White – drums

Technical personnel
 Patrick MacDougall – engineer
 Tim Weidner – engineer
 Mike Pietrini – mastering
 Karl Groom – mixing
 Roger Dean – painting

Reception
The album made #23 in the UK Rock album chart.

References

External links 
 Official band website at YesWorld

Yes (band) albums
Albums with cover art by Roger Dean (artist)